Ryan Kent (born 11 November 1996) is an English professional footballer who plays as a winger for  club Rangers.

A graduate of the Liverpool academy, Kent made his single first-team appearance for the club in January 2016, after a loan spell with Coventry City. He spent the 2016–17 season on loan at Barnsley and won the club's Young Player of the Season award. After a loan spell with German club Freiburg in 2017, he departed on loan once again, joining Bristol City. Kent signed for Scottish club Rangers permanently in September 2019, after winning the PFA Scotland Young Player of the Year award while playing for them on loan in the 2018–19 season.

He is a former England youth international, having represented the nation at under-18 and under-20 levels.

Club career

Liverpool

Early career

Oldham-born Kent joined Liverpool at the age of seven and progressed through the Liverpool academy to become a regular member of the U21 squad. After an impressive end to the 2014–15 campaign for the reserves his performances were rewarded with a new four and a half-year contract in March 2015. This was followed by a call-up to the first-team squad for their 2015 pre-season tour with the player being named in Liverpool's 30-man squad for their tour of Thailand, Australia and Malaysia. On 17 July 2015 Kent made his first-team debut when he came off the bench in the 2–1 win over Australian A-League side Brisbane Roar and was handed a first-team squad number for the Reds.

Loans to Coventry City and Barnsley
Liverpool received a number of offers to take Kent on loan after the player impressed in preseason. Kent eventually joined Coventry City in September 2015, on a youth loan deal for four months until 16 January 2016. He made his professional debut while at Coventry City, as a substitute on 12 September 2015 in a 1–0 League One loss to Scunthorpe United. On 3 November, Kent played and scored in a 4–3 win over Barnsley. The next day it was announced that he would return to Liverpool during the upcoming international break to be assessed by new Liverpool manager Jürgen Klopp. On 5 January 2016, he was recalled by Liverpool and was named in the first-team to make his competitive debut for them, starting the FA Cup third round match away to Exeter City. The match ended 2–2 with Kent being withdrawn from the action after 57 minutes.

On 26 July 2016, Kent was loaned to Barnsley for the season. He scored his first goal for them in a 4–0 win against Rotherham United on 27 August 2016. Kent was named Barnsley's Young Player of the Season at the club's end of season awards.

Loans to Freiburg and Bristol City
On 10 August 2017, after an impressive preseason, Kent signed a new long-term contract with Liverpool, and was loaned out to Freiburg for the season on the last day of the summer transfer window. After making just six appearances, Kent's loan spell at Freiburg was terminated and he returned to parent club Liverpool on 8 January.

On 12 January 2018, Kent joined Bristol City on loan until the end of the season. His stint with the Robins was unsuccessful, as he played just 10 league games, failing to find the back of the net in any. It was later reported that Bristol City would be fined £300,000 by Liverpool due to Kent's lack of playing time.

Rangers

2018–19: Initial loan spell

On 22 July 2018, Kent joined Rangers on season-long loan for the 2018–19 season. He made his debut on 26 July 2018 in the Europa League 0–1 victory against NK Osijek. He made his SPFL debut on 5 August 2018, in a 1–1 draw against Aberdeen. His first goal for the club came on 15 September 2018, in a 4–0 victory against Dundee. On 31 March 2019, Kent scored in the Old Firm derby against Celtic in a 2–1 loss. During the match Kent became involved in an altercation with Celtic captain Scott Brown, who was shoved to the ground. Kent was charged by the Scottish FA retrospectively. He received a two match ban after losing his appeal.
He made 43 appearances in all competitions, scoring six goals and making nine assists for the club. On 7 April, Kent won the 'Young Player of The Year Award for the 2018–19 season for Rangers at the club's end of season awards. On 5 May 2019, Kent won the 2018–19 PFA Scotland Young Player of the Year after his performance for Rangers. He was also voted in the PFA Scotland Team of the Year for the 2018–19 season.

Kent returned to Liverpool for the 2019–20 pre-season with manager Jürgen Klopp wanting to assess Kent's development, with Rangers manager Steven Gerrard advising he wanted Kent to re-sign for Rangers on loan. Kent was also subject of interest from Leeds United, with Leeds head coach Marcelo Bielsa also personally scouting Kent for Liverpool's pre-season friendly against Bradford City. Kent was involved in pre-season friendlies involving Bradford City, Borussia Dortmund, Sporting CP and Sevilla. Klopp singled out Kent for praise after his performance against Sevilla, saying: "Ryan had sensational moments in the Sevilla game – one-on-one situations are his big strength. He is a wonderful kid, a wonderful player."

2019–present: Permanent transfer
Kent signed for Rangers permanently on 3 September 2019 on a four-year contract. Rangers paid Liverpool an initial transfer fee of £6.5 million, with further payments potentially due for future performance or Kent being sold.

International career
Kent scored two goals in two appearances for the England under-18 team. He made six appearances and scored one goal for the England under-20 team.

Style of play
Kent plays as a winger, comfortable on both flanks, but mainly playing as a left winger, he can also play as a second striker or an attacking midfielder. He is known for his dribbling ability running with the ball, especially with 'one-on-one situations', as well as his workrate and crossing ability.

Career statistics

Honours
Rangers
Scottish Premiership: 2020–21
Scottish Cup: 2021–22
Scottish League Cup runner-up: 2019–20
 UEFA Europa League runner-up: 2021–22

Individual
Barnsley Young Player of the Season: 2016–17
PFA Scotland Young Player of the Year: 2018–19
PFA Scotland Team of the Year: 2018–19 Scottish Premiership, 2020–21 Scottish Premiership
Rangers Young Player of the Year: 2018–19
UEFA Europa League Team of the Season: 2021–22

References

External links

Profile at the Rangers F.C. website

1996 births
Living people
Footballers from Oldham
English footballers
Association football wingers
Liverpool F.C. players
Coventry City F.C. players
Barnsley F.C. players
SC Freiburg players
Bristol City F.C. players
Rangers F.C. players
English Football League players
Bundesliga players
Scottish Professional Football League players
England youth international footballers
English expatriate footballers
Expatriate footballers in Germany
English expatriate sportspeople in Germany